Relations between Belarus and Venezuela were formally established on February 4, 1997. Both countries recognized each other five years earlier on January 11, 1992.
 
Belarus has an embassy in Caracas and Venezuela has an embassy in Minsk. Both countries are members of the Non-Aligned Movement.

History

Military relations

In 2006, Venezuelan President Hugo Chávez publicly stated that his country needed modern air defense systems to cover the air borders from the Caribbean coast to the border with Brazil.

As the President of Belarus Alexander Lukashenko recalled later, the Venezuelans needed help reorganizing the army. They bought various air defense systems, airplanes and other weapons, but did not have a good military school to use all this. Deputy Chief of the General Staff of the Belarusian Army  noted that there was no unified air defense system in Venezuela, there were only separate units.

In December 2007, the leaders of the two countries signed an agreement in Caracas to supply Venezuela with two unified command centers, one for air defense and the other for electronic warfare. Its validity was for five years, but automatically extendable for equal periods until one of the parties denounces it one year in advance. It also contemplated the delivery to Venezuela of technologies for manufacturing military equipment, its maintenance and repair. In April 2008, the Parliament of Belarus ratified the agreement. According to the agreements of 2007, the activity of Belarusians was designed for five years. At the same time, the agreement was supposed to be automatically extended for another five years. The military presence of Belarus could be suspended at the request of one of the parties.

The group of military specialists was headed by general . In the future, he will become the ambassador of Belarus to Venezuela.

The first ten military consultants arrived in Venezuela in 2008. Their families also arrived with the specialists. Over time, the contingent increased.

Activity
Belarusian advisers offered Venezuela a project of systemic protection of the state. He meant the organization of an integrated defense complex, including air defense, electronic warfare, and counteraction to precision weapons. It was necessary to build a new defense system, install existing weapons in it and purchase the necessary new ones while explaining everything to the Venezuelan colleagues. Based on the proposals of military consultants, the Venezuelan army acquired automated air defense and Air Force command and control systems, Belarusian-made radar and electronic warfare equipment, as well as air defense systems.

Within the framework of the program for the protection of especially important objects on the territory of Venezuela created the bases of the deployment of the Tor and Pechora-2M air defense systems. The Venezuelan authorities have signed contracts with military enterprises not only of Belarus but also of Russia, China, and Iran.

The activity of Belarusian military specialists ended in 2013. At that time, Venezuela managed to complete the systematization and modernization of the defense system. The Republic of Belarus has successfully coped with the role of an integrator of the air defense system.

See also

 Foreign relations of Belarus
 Foreign relations of Venezuela

References

Further reading
 Алескандр Алесин. Противовоздушная оборона: Уго Чавес умер, но дело его живет // Белрынок : онлайн-издание. — 6 сентября 2019.
 Carlos E. Hernández. Venezuela y Belarús: una estrecha relación militar // Infodefensa : газета. — 14 декабря 2015.

External links
 

 
Venezuela
Bilateral relations of Venezuela